Tau-, Psi- and phi- type figurines date back to 1450–1100 BC in Mycenaean Greece. They were typically small (about 10cm high), made of terracotta, although a group of ivory figurines has been found, and were found in tombs, shrines and settlement areas. They are classified by their shape and a resemblance to the Greek letters of tau (τ), psi (ψ) and phi (Φ), according to a typological system created by Arne Furumark in 1941.

Their function/purpose is unknown, although it has been suggested that their purpose changed with the context in which they were found.  Possible uses were children's toys, votive figurines or grave offerings.

Some figurines appear to wear flattened headdresses, which suggests they may be goddesses. However, it is difficult to distinguish between goddesses and worshippers. It is likely that they were made by the same craftsmen who made Mycenaean vases, as the decoration techniques are similar.

Examples of such figurines are held by the Goulandris Museum of Cycladic Art (Athens), the British Museum (London), and the Metropolitan Museum of Art (New York) among other places.

See also
 Mycenaean figurine on tripod

References

Archaeological artefact types
Ancient Greek pottery figurines
Mycenaean art